Charles François Prosper Count de Hemricourt de Grunne  (1875 - 24 April 1937 in Amiens) was Belgian nobleman, politician and mayor.

Charles was War volunteer in the First World War. He was elected mayor of Aalter, and took office between 1921 and 1932. Charles had constructed  Loveld Castle in Aalter, and decorated it with the heritage of his mother in French Style.

Honours
 Knight of the Order of Leopold.
 War Cross
 knight of the Legion of Honour.

References

1875 births
1937 deaths
Counts of Belgium
Chevaliers of the Légion d'honneur
Mayors of places in Belgium
Order of Leopold (Belgium)